Georgetown is a 2019 American crime drama film directed by Christoph Waltz (in his feature directorial debut) and written by David Auburn. It is based on Franklin Foer's 2012 New York Times Magazine article "The Worst Marriage in Georgetown", which details the 2011 murder of 91-year-old socialite Viola Herms Drath by her much-younger second husband in the Georgetown neighborhood of Washington, D.C. Waltz stars alongside Vanessa Redgrave, Annette Bening and Corey Hawkins.

It had its world premiere at the Tribeca Film Festival on April 27, 2019. It received a limited release in the United States on May 14, 2021, by Vertical Entertainment.

Plot
An ambitious social climber becomes the main suspect in the death of his wealthy and much older wife.

Cast
 Christoph Waltz as Ulrich Mott
 Vanessa Redgrave as Elsa Breht
 Annette Bening as Amanda Breht
 Corey Hawkins as Daniel Volker
 Laura de Carteret as Eleanor Price
 Saad Suddiqui as Zahari
 Ron Lea as Detective Reid
 Alexander Crowther as Matthew

Production
It was announced in May 2015 that Christoph Waltz would make his feature directorial debut with The Worst Marriage in Georgetown, in which he would also star as the main character Ulrich Mott.

In May 2017, Vanessa Redgrave was cast in the film, now titled Georgetown, as the wealthy socialite Mott marries in order to up his social status. Annette Bening joined the film in September, with filming commencing in Toronto between August 3 and September 16, 2017.

Release
It had its world premiere at the Tribeca Film Festival on April 27, 2019. Its earliest theatrical release was in Italy on June 16, 2020. It was released in the United States on May 14, 2021, in a limited release by Vertical Entertainment. It was released on video on demand on May 18, 2021, by Paramount Home Entertainment.

Reception

Box office
Georgetown grossed $2,132 in Italy.

Critical response
On Metacritic, it holds a weighted average score of 49 out of 100, based on eight critics, indicating "mixed or average reviews".

John DeFore of The Hollywood Reporter praised the film, noting that "it's the kind of serious but broadly appealing, modestly scaled picture that people love to say doesn't exist any more."

In The New York Times, Calum Marsh praised Waltz's performance, saying that "he is a pleasure to watch."

References

External links
 
 

2019 films
2019 crime drama films
2019 directorial debut films
2010s American films
2010s English-language films
American crime drama films
American films based on actual events
American nonlinear narrative films
Crime films based on actual events
Drama films based on actual events
Films about murder
Films based on newspaper and magazine articles
Films scored by Lorne Balfe
Films set in Washington, D.C.
Films shot in Toronto
Uxoricide in fiction
Vertical Entertainment films